Wat Mahathat ("Temple of Great Relic" or "Temple of Great Reliquary") is the common short name of several important Buddhist temples in Thailand. The name may refer to:

 Wat Mahathat
 Wat Mahathat (Fak Tha, Uttaradit), Fak Tha District, Uttaradit Province
 Wat Mahathat (Nakhon Phanom), Nakhon Phanom Province
 Wat Mahathat (Ayutthaya), Phra Nakhon Si Ayutthaya Province
 Wat Mahathat (Phetchaburi), Phetchaburi Province
 Wat Mahathat (Phichai, Uttaradit), Phichai District, Uttaradit Province
 , Ratchaburi Province
 Wat Mahathat (Sukhothai), Sukhothai Province
 Wat Mahathat (Yasothon), Yasothon Province
 Wat Mahathat Yuwaratrangsarit, Bangkok
 Wat Phra Mahathat, Nakhon Si Thammarat Province
 Wat Phra Si Rattana Mahathat
 Wat Phra Si Rattana Mahathat (Bangkok), Bangkok
 Wat Phra Si Rattana Mahathat (Lop Buri), Lop Buri Province
 Wat Phra Si Rattana Mahathat, Phitsanulok Province
 Wat Phra Si Rattana Mahathat (Ratchaburi), Ratchaburi Province
 Wat Phra Si Rattana Mahathat (Sukhothai), Sukhothai Province
 Wat Phra Si Rattana Mahathat (Suphan Buri), Suphan Buri Province